Adamsdale may refer to:

Places
 Adamsdale, Massachusetts
 Adamsdale, Ontario
 Adamsdale, Pennsylvania

People
 Will Adamsdale